Aaron Lynch (born March 8, 1993) is an American football defensive end who is a free agent. He was drafted by the San Francisco 49ers in the fifth round of the 2014 NFL Draft. He played college football at South Florida and Notre Dame.

High school career
Lynch attended Island Coast High School in Cape Coral, Florida. He led the team to 11–2 record and Florida 2B state semifinal playoff appearance as senior in 2010. He also recorded 31 solo stops and 10.5 sacks during senior campaign. He played in the U.S Army All-American Bowl in San Antonio, Texas in 2011.

Considered a four-star recruit by Rivals.com, Lynch was listed as the No. 3 defensive end in the nation. After de-committing from Florida State, he re-committed to Notre Dame over offers from Florida and Miami.

College career
In 2011, Lynch enrolled a semester early at Notre Dame and was able to participate in spring practice. He worked his way onto the second-team and dominated in the annual Blue-Gold game. In his freshman season, he played in 12 games, starting in 6 of them. He recorded 33 tackles including 7 tackles for loss, a team high 5.5 sacks, and a team high of 14 quarterback hurries. He was awarded a 1st team selection on The 11th annual Football Writers Association of America Freshman All-America Team

In April 2012, Lynch decided to transfer from Notre Dame, citing a desire to return closer to his home. After pondering his options, he announced his transfer to USF. He applied for a waiver to play immediately but the NCAA denied his request, forcing him to sit out the 2012 season.

As a junior, Lynch led the Bulls with six sacks and 12.5 tackles for loss, playing in all 12 games. He finished with 30 total tackles and added a fumble recovery returned for a touchdown in a 13–10 win over the Connecticut Huskies. Lynch had a strong finish to the season despite the Bulls' 3–9 record, totaling all six sacks in the last seven games.

Lynch announced in December 2013 that he would declare for the 2014 NFL Draft.

Professional career

San Francisco 49ers

Lynch was drafted by the San Francisco 49ers in the fifth round with the 150th overall pick of the 2014 NFL Draft.

Lynch was given an opportunity and assisted on four tackles and made two solo tackles on November 9 against the New Orleans Saints. His six tackles in addition to his pass defended helped the San Francisco 49ers excel in an overtime battle to defeat the Saints and remain in the playoff picture. Lynch finished his rookie season recording 23 tackles, six sacks, and four passes defensed with three starts in 16 appearances. In the 2015 season, he appeared in 14 games and started all but one of them. He had 6.5 sacks, 38 total tackles, and three passes defensed. He was suspended for the first four games of the 2016 season for a violation of the NFL's substance abuse policy. He appeared in seven games and started three in the 2016 season. He recorded 1.5 sacks and 13 total tackles. In the 2017 season, Lynch did not appear in the season opener with back injury. He played in the next five games before suffering a calf injury against the Washington Redskins in Week 6, which sidelined him until Week 14. He had one sack, nine total tackles, and one fumble recovery.

Chicago Bears
On March 15, 2018, Lynch signed a one-year contract with the Chicago Bears. He played in 13 games with three starts, recording 16 tackles, three sacks, and an interception.

On April 1, 2019, Lynch re-signed with the Bears.
In Week 1 against the Green Bay Packers, Lynch recorded one tackle and sacked Aaron Rodgers once as the Bears lost 10–3.

Jacksonville Jaguars
On May 5, 2020, Lynch signed a one-year contract with the Jacksonville Jaguars. He retired from football on August 18, 2020, citing personal reasons. After two months of retirement, on October 21, 2020, Lynch was reinstated back to the Jaguars' active roster.

In Week 12 against the Cleveland Browns, Lynch recorded his first sack as a Jaguar on Baker Mayfield during the 27–25 loss.

References

External links
 Chicago Bears bio
 Notre Dame Fighting Irish bio
 South Florida Bulls bio

1993 births
Living people
American football defensive ends
American football defensive tackles
Notre Dame Fighting Irish football players
People from Cape Coral, Florida
Players of American football from Florida
South Florida Bulls football players
San Francisco 49ers players
Chicago Bears players
Jacksonville Jaguars players